Ian Roderick Macneil of Barra (20 June 1929 - 16 February 2010), The Macneil of Barra, Chief of Clan MacNeil, also known as Clan Niall and 26th of Barra, also Baron of Barra) was a Scottish American legal scholar.

Early life and education
Macneil was the son of Robert Lister Macneil. He was educated at the University of Vermont, USA (BA, 1950, majoring in Sociology) and Harvard (LL.B., 1955) where he studied contracts under the noted theorist Lon L. Fuller. He was a Fellow of the American Academy of Arts and Sciences. He served as an infantry Lieutenant in the US Army from 1951 to 1953 and remained in the reserve until 1969, when he was honourably discharged with the rank of Major. He married Nancy (née Wilson) and they had three sons (one deceased) and a daughter.

Career

His legal career began as a Clerk to the US Court of Appeals (1955–1956), followed by practising law in Concord, New Hampshire, until 1959, when he became assistant professor of law at Cornell University, advancing to associate professor in 1962, then a full professorship, and finally becoming the Frank B. Ingersoll Professor of Law. In 1972 he became professor of law at the University of Virginia and in 1980 Wigmore Professor at Northwestern University. After retirement he became John Henry Wigmore Professor Emeritus at Northwestern but went to live in Edinburgh throughout his retirement, where he was highly active in the affairs of the Clan Macneil. He spent some time at the University of East Africa at Dar es Salaam (now the University of Dar es Salaam) as visiting professor in 1965–1967, part of a highly distinguished tradition at Dar es Salaam that also hosted William Twining and Patrick Atiyah.

Macneil as Clan Chief
According to clan tradition, Ian Macneil, having succeeded his father, Robert Lister Macneil of Barra in 1970, was the 46th Chief of the Clan, in line of descent from Niall of the Nine Hostages, High King of Ireland, and 26th Macneil of Barra. Notable events during his tenure included his gifting of the crofting estate of Barra to the Scottish nation, and his granting of a lease of the medieval Kisimul Castle to Historic Scotland for 1000 years at an annual rent of £1 and one bottle of whisky. On his death he was succeeded in the position of Chief by his son Roderick Wilson Macneil.<ref>See Who's Who' (A&C Black: London).</ref>

Scholarship
Macneil was a scholar  in the field of contract law and is particularly associated (along with  Stewart Macaulay) with the invention of "Relational Contract Theory". This theory had its first outing at the Association of American Law Professors' annual conference in late 1967 and was first alluded to in print in Macneil's article "Whither Contracts?" in 1969. However, the first really substantial articles laying down the foundations of the theory appeared in 1974. "Restatement (Second) of Contracts and Presentiation" and "The Many Futures of Contracts". He developed the theory further in "Contracts: Adjustment of Long-Term Economic Relations Under Classical, Neoclassical, and Relational Contract Law", and in his monograph The New Social Contract. He wrote more on relational contracts after 1980, mainly concerned with explaining and defending the theory, which has been much misunderstood by academic commentators, whether critical of or in favour of relational theory, but the outlines and much of the detail of the theory were settled by 1980.

In 2000 Macneil renamed his theory "essential contract theory" to distinguish it from other possible versions of relational contract Further interesting explanation has been given by Macneil in "Reflections on Relational Contract Theory after a Neo-classical Seminar".

Macneil was also responsible, with Speidel and Stipanowich for a magisterial five-volume treatise on US arbitration law, Federal Arbitration Law: Agreements, Awards, and Remedies under the Federal Arbitration Act(Little, Brown: Boston, 1994), which in 1995 won the American Association of Publishers' Best New Legal Book award, as well as a monograph on arbitration.

The main elements of Macneil's relational contract theory were developed in a series of publications from 1969 to 1980, some of which are outlined below. He continued to publish articles and participate in colloquia in this field after 1980; however, the publications discussed below represent the key, formative literature of Macneil's version of relational theory. Subsequent publications have been mainly explanatory of the work done throughout the 1970s.

Essential Contract Theory
Macneil's theory posits that the traditional approach of doctrinal contract law in the common law countries, which he calls "classical" and "neoclassical", which concentrates on "the deal" at its time of making, and treats individual contracts as discrete entities, is an inadequate and inaccurate tool for the study of contracts. He argues that all contracts are in fact not discrete at all but belong in the context of complex webs of exchange relations. This theory can be seen as a counter to both the "death of contract" idea, that contract as a separate idea was no longer relevant and that breach of contract is best regarded just as another tort (civil wrong), most closely associated with Grant Gilmore, and to Legal formalism in contract, in which the approach is to ignore, to a large extent, contextual matters surrounding the contract and concentrate only on the express terms and a strictly limited range of implied terms (though Robert E. Scott has argued that a formalist approach can still work within the context of an acceptance of a relational view of contract). Contract relations fall along a spectrum from the highly relational (e.g., long-term employment contracts) to the "as if discrete", largely transactionalised relation (e.g., spot purchases of commodities). All relations, though, are connected with and belong within a broader social context, with which successful relations must be harmonised. It is possible to draw axes through many facets of contractual relations, indicating the likely features of such facets in relations falling at different points along the spectrum.

What is particularly distinctive about his approach is his postulation of a number of "norms in a positivist sense", of which 10 common contract norms apply to all contracts: (i) role integrity; (ii) reciprocity (or 'mutuality'); (iii) implementation of planning; (iv) effectuation of consent; (v) flexibility; (vi) contractual solidarity; (vii) the 'linking norms' (restitution, reliance and expectation interests); (viii) the power norm (creation and restraint of power); (ix) propriety of means; and (x) harmonisation with the social matrix.
By "norms in a positivist sense" Macneil means that they are norms-in-fact, that is to say that they are observable in operation, to distinguish them from norms in the sense of normative as opposed to positive economics. The extent to which a particular exchange relation is in harmony with the norms is likely to influence the success of the relation in terms of its longevity (where appropriate) and the ability of the parties to gain the full range of benefits that the exchange can potentially offer. The extent to which the actual doctrinal law harmonises with these norms can arguably determine the usefulness of legal tools and interventions in exchange relations, but it is a complicated question.

Reception
A symposium on relational contract theory was held at Northwestern University in 1999, with papers given by a number of American contract scholars including Stewart Macaulay, Melvin Eisenberg, Jay Feinman, Eric Posner, Robert E. Scott, and Richard Speidel.

Macneil's work is often considered inaccessible and difficult to read. And Macneil expressed some disappointment at the reception of the work among legal scholars: 'I have now had over a decade to accept that there had never been any race to a relational theory of contract, nor have the succeeding years seen either widespread acceptance of (or indeed much challenge to) my particular theory or the development of other relational theories.' However, the Northwestern symposium and other more recent work goes some way to correcting that omission. In particular, David Campbell has published an edited collection of Macneil's relational contract theory work. Macneil's work in particular has also been discussed by Richard Austen-Baker, who relates Macneil's system of norms to English contract law doctrine, and used Macneil's theory to discuss the need or otherwise of further regulation of consumer contracts.

Death
Macneil died 16 February 2010, at the age of 80.

Selected bibliography
Macneil is the author of over 60 papers, monographs and other works.

I.R. Macneil:
'When Acceptance Becomes Effective' in R.B. Schlesinger (Ed) Formation of Contracts: A Study of the Common Core of Legal Systems (Oceana Pubs: Dobbs Ferry, 1968)
'Whither Contracts?' (1969) 21 Journal of Legal Education 403
'Restatement (Second) of Contracts and Presentiation' (1974) 60 Virginia Law Review 589
'The Many Futures of Contracts' (1974) 47 Southern California Law Review 691
'A Primer of Contract Planning' (1975) 48 Southern California Law Review 627
'Contracts: Adjustment of Long-Term Economic Relations Under Classical, Neoclassical, and Relational Contract Law' (1978) 72 Northwestern University Law Review 854Contracts: Exchange Transactions and Relations, 2d edn (Foundation Press: Mineola, 1978) (1st edn, 1971)The New Social Contract (Yale UP: New Haven, Conn, 1980)
'Economic Analysis of Contractual Relations: Its Shortfalls and the Need for a "Rich Classifactory Apparatus"' (1981) 75 Northwestern University Law Review 1018
'Efficient Breach: Circles in the Sky' (1982) 68 Virginia Law Review 947
'Values in Contract: Internal and External' (1983) 78 Northwestern University Law Review 340
'Reflections on Relational Contract' (1985) 141 Journal of Institutional and Theoretical Economics 541
'Exchange Revisited: Individual Utility and Social Solidarity' (1986) 96 Ethics 567
'Relational Contract Theory as Sociology: A reply to Professors Lindenberg and de Vos' (1987) 143 Journal of Institutional and Theoretical Economics 272
'Contract Remedies: A Need for a Better Efficiency Analysis' (1988) 144 Journal of Institutional and Theoretical Economics 6American Arbitration Law: Reformulation – Nationalisation – Internationalisation (OUP: Oxford, 1992)

(with R.E. Speidel and T.J. Stipanowich) Federal Arbitration Law: Agreements, Awards and Remedies Under the Federal Arbitration Act (5 vols) (Little, Brown: Boston, 1994)
'Contracting Worlds and Essential Contract Theory' (2000) 9 Social and Legal Studies 431
'Relational Contract Theory: Challenges and Queries' (2000) 94 Northwestern University Law Review 877
'Reflections on Relational Contract Theory after a Neo-classical Seminar' in H. Collins, D. Campbell and J. Wightman (Eds), The Implicit Dimensions of Contract'' (Hart: Oxford, 2003)

References

1929 births
2010 deaths
Harvard University alumni
University of Vermont alumni
Northwestern University faculty
Cornell University faculty
University of Virginia faculty
Scottish clan chiefs
American people of Scottish descent
Ian Roderick
Legal writers
Scottish lawyers
20th-century American writers
21st-century American writers
Scottish feudal barons
20th-century Scottish businesspeople